Iotaphora is a genus of moths in the family Geometridae.

Species
Iotaphora admirabilis (Oberthur, 1884)
Iotaphora iridicolor (Butler, 1880)

References
Natural History Museum Lepidoptera genus database

Geometrinae